Pentagonaster duebeni is a species of starfish within the family Goniasteridae.

Distribution & habitat 
Pentagonaster duebeni is distributed off the Australian coasts from Shark Bay to Tasmania and southern Queensland. Its preferred habitat is exposed and sheltered reefs at depths up to 160 meters below sea level.

Description & feeding 
Pentagonaster duebeni is a 5 armed flattened starfish with blunted arms separated by rounded arcs. Surface is layered with polygonal plates colored red and orange separated with yellow-white incisions. Arms are equal in length to the central disc, reaching a lengths up to 8 centimeters. Sizes reach up to 8 centimeters in width. P. duebeni diet consists of sponges, bryozoans, and other invertebrates.

Specimens from southern Western Australian show colors in various shades of dark to light red plates with raised dorsal plates. Sizes have been recorded at over 11 centimeters in width with slightly longer arm lengths.

References 

Starfish described in 1847
Goniasteridae
Echinoderms of Oceania